Paremhat 10 - Coptic Calendar - Paremhat 12 

The eleventh day of the Coptic month of Paremhat, the seventh month of the Coptic year. In common years, this day corresponds to March 7, of the Julian Calendar, and March 20, of the Gregorian Calendar. This day falls in the Coptic Season of Shemu, the season of the Harvest.

Commemorations

Martyrs 

 The martyrdom of Saint Basil the Bishop

References 

Days of the Coptic calendar